HNoMS Trygg (trygg is Norwegian for safe, secure, dependable) was a torpedo boat of the Royal Norwegian Navy. Her hull was built in Moss and she was finished in Horten, with build number 109. Trygg had two sister ships: HNoMS Snøgg and HNoMS Stegg. Together the three vessels formed the Trygg class of torpedo boats.

Neutrality protection 
At the outbreak of the Second World War, Trygg and other Norwegian warships were deployed along the Norwegian coastline to guard against neutrality violations by the warring parties. In one incident the British submarine Triad suffered technical difficulties off the Norwegian coast and was forced to enter Norwegian territorial waters near Bergen on 1 December 1939. After the submarine had been allowed to carry out rudimentary emergency repairs, Trygg escorted her out of Norwegian waters the next day.

Norwegian Campaign service
During the Norwegian Campaign Trygg was commanded by Lieutenant Frantz W. Munster and served in an air defence and escort role against the invading Germans outside Molde and Åndalsnes in April 1940 (Åndalsnes landings). After surviving numerous air attacks the ship was finally sunk at Åndalsnes 25 April 1940.

As the torpedo boat was anchored up in the harbour the Luftwaffe bombers first attacked and knocked out British AA positions ashore before turning their attention towards the small Norwegian warship. A total of sixteen bombs were dropped against Trygg, one hitting the stern of the ship and passing through without exploding. The damage the bomb caused on its way through Trygg was however too much for her to stay afloat. Although Munster beached his ship before the stern went under, the ship settled on her side and sank in shallow waters the next day.

German service as the Zick
The ship was salvaged by the Germans, renamed Zick, later renamed again to V.5506 Zick, and served as a Vorpostenboot on the coast of Norway until she was sunk by 21 de Havilland Mosquitos from 235 and 248 Squadrons RAF on 23 October 1944. She was escorting a three-ship convoy in Hjeltefjord near Bergen when the convoy came under attack by the rocket and autocannon firing Mosquitos.

All three cargo ships in the convoy suffered damage while Zick was blown apart, taking three Germans down with her. Before she was sunk Zick managed to slightly damage two of the attacking aircraft with her anti-aircraft armament.

Footnotes

Bibliography
 
 
 
 
 

Naval ships of Norway captured by Germany during World War II
Patrol boats
Ships built in Moss, Norway
Ships built in Horten
Trygg-class torpedo boats
World War II torpedo boats of Norway
World War II shipwrecks in the North Sea
1919 ships
Maritime incidents in April 1940
Maritime incidents in October 1944
Ships sunk by German aircraft
Ships sunk by British aircraft